The United States's Mandrel nuclear test series was a group of 52 nuclear tests conducted in 1969–1970. These tests  followed the Operation Bowline series and preceded the Operation Emery series.

References

Explosions in 1969
Explosions in 1970
1969 in military history
1970 in military history
Mandrel
1969 in the United States
1970 in the United States